Stradbally GAA may refer to:

Stradbally GAA (Laois), a sports club in Leinster, Ireland
Stradbally GAA (Waterford), a sports club in Munster, Ireland